North Dakota Highway 19 (ND 19) is an east–west route through central North Dakota. It has one concurrency with US Highway 281 (US 281) for  near Minnewaukan.

Route description
ND 19 begins at the McHenry–Pierce county line traveling east as a continuation of CR 19. After this intersection, the route heads northeast for two miles and forms the northern border of the Buffalo Lake National Wildlife Refuge, crossing Buffalo Lake in the process.

 after entering Benson County, ND 19 enters the small city of Esmond. After leaving Esmond, the route travels north for two miles. During this concurrency, the route travels northwest for three miles, then due north for the last mile (1.6 km). After this concurrency, the highway heads east once more and crosses Pelican Lake before crossing Oswalds Bay and entering Ramsey County.

In Ramsey County, the route travels east and crosses Sixmile Bay and Creel Bay. ND 19 serves as the major route between the city of Devils Lake and Devils Lake Regional Airport. The highway intersects US 2 in eastern Devils Lake. Less than a mile farther east, ND 19 meets its eastern terminus at a junction with ND 20.

History
The majority of ND 19, the portion from its eastern terminus in Devils Lake to its junction with ND 3, was completed in 1939 and was the original alignment of the route. The small portion from ND 3 to its current western terminus at the McHenry–Pierce county line was completed between 1965 and 1975.

Major intersections

References

External links

North Dakota Highways – ND 1-30

019
Transportation in McHenry County, North Dakota
Transportation in Pierce County, North Dakota
Transportation in Benson County, North Dakota
Transportation in Ramsey County, North Dakota